This is a list of Bengali language films that are scheduled to be released in 2018

January–March

April–June

July–September

October–December

References

Notes

2018 in Indian cinema
Lists of 2018 films by country or language
2018